David Knights (born David John Knights, 28 June 1945, Islington, North London) is a British musician who was the original bass guitarist in the band Procol Harum. He played bass on the hit single "A Whiter Shade of Pale". He was in the band long enough to play on their first three albums. He departed in 1969, to be replaced by Chris Copping. When he was in Procol Harum he used a Gibson EB-0 bass.

He also performed with a band named Ruby, that released one album before disbanding. He also produced a single for Mickey Jupp's Legend group. He is fairly inactive in the music industry these days.

References

External links
 [ David Knights mini-biography] at Allmusic website
 David Knights' Fan page at procolharum.com

1945 births
Living people
English bass guitarists
English male guitarists
Male bass guitarists
Procol Harum members
Progressive rock bass guitarists